is a university hospital located in Hirakata, Osaka, Japan, affiliated with Kansai Medical University (KMU).

History 
When Kansai Medical University moved to another site that was used for a factory before, a new hospital was also built and opened as Kansai Medical University Hirakata Hospital in 2006. When it was opened, the former hospital was renamed Kansai Medical University Takii Hospital (Nowadays General Medical Center), and the former campuses in Takii and in Makino were also integrated into the new campus. The new Hirakata Campus of KMU was opened next to the hospital in 2013, and the new hospital was renamed Kansai Medical University Hospital in 2016.

Medical Departments 
This hospital has following departments:

 Hematology-Oncology
 Respiratory Oncology
 Respiratory Medicine, Infectious Diseases
 Cardiological Medicine
 Renal Medicine
 Endocrine Medicine
 Diabetes
 Gastrointestinal and Hepatic Medicine
 Psychosomatic Medicine
 General Clinical Department
 Neurology
 Neuropsychiatry
 Pediatrics
 Hepatic Surgery
 Biliary Pancreatic Surgery
 Gastrointestinal Surgery
 Pediatric Surgery
 Breast Surgery
 Cardiovascular Surgery
 Pediatric Cardiovascular Surgery

 General Thoracic Surgery
 Neurosurgery
 Pediatric Neurosurgery
 Orthopedic Surgery
 Plastic and Reconstructive Surgery
 Dermatology
 Urology
 Ophthalmology
 Otolaryngology, Head and Neck Surgery
 Dentistry and Oral Surgery
 Radiotherapy
 Obstetrics and Gynecology
 Anesthesiology
 Clinical Laboratory Medicine
 Pathology and Diagnostics
 Emergency and Critical Care Medicine
 Rehabilitation
 Rheumatology and Clinical Immunology
 Health Sciences
 Peripheral Vascular Surgery

Access
 Hirakatashi Station

See also
 Kansai Medical University

External links
 関西医科大学附属病院 - Official website in Japanese
 Kansai Medical University Hospital - Official website in English

References

Hirakata, Osaka
Hospitals in Osaka Prefecture
Hospitals established in 2006
Hospital buildings completed in 2006
Teaching hospitals in Japan
2006 establishments in Japan